Bulwer Island is a  reclaimed tidal mangrove island at the mouth of the Brisbane River in the suburb of Pinkenba, Brisbane, Queensland, Australia.  It is named for Sir Edward Bulwer-Lytton, the British Colonial Secretary who separated Queensland from New South Wales in 1859 and made Sir George Bowen its first Governor.

Air crash
In May 1961 a TAA DC-4 airliner crashed onto Bulwer Island during landing at Brisbane Airport. The pilot had suffered cardiac arrest and slumped over the control column preventing the co-pilot from regaining control before the plane dived into the mud of the island.

Oil refinery

Land was reclaimed joining the island to the mainland commencing in 1963. An oil refinery commenced operations in 1965, and was converted to an import terminal in 2015.

Lighthouse

A lighthouse, known as Bulwer Island Light, stood on the island between 1912 and 1983, as part of a pair of leading light. In 1983 it was replaced by a skeletal tower and relocated to the Queensland Maritime Museum in Brisbane.

See also

List of islands of Australia
List of oil refineries

References

Islands of Queensland
Pinkenba, Queensland